Niana Jose Evidente Guerrero (born January 27, 2006), better known as Niana Guerrero, is a Filipino dancer, singer and social media personality. She is known for her dance covers with her brother Ranz Kyle.

Life and career
Guerrero is the daughter of Niño Guerrero and Elcid Evidente. All fellow YouTubers, she has three older half-siblings from her parents' previous relationships, including Ranz Kyle, and one younger full sister Natalia. She made her first appearance in a Chicser dance cover of "Teach Me How to Dougie" in 2011. In 2017, she gained fame in YouTube for her "Despacito" dance cover and has been making dance covers, especially with Ranz Kyle since then. In November 2019, she joined TikTok, where she usually posts dance videos. She is the most followed TikTok personality in the Philippines, reaching more than 30 million followers.

Filmography

Awards and nominations

References

2006 births
Living people
Filipino YouTubers
Filipino female dancers
People from Quezon City